Fashalanj (also Romanized as Fashālanj and Fashālenj; also known as Fashālaj, Fashalani, and Fīshehlānī) is a village in Qaqazan-e Gharbi Rural District, in the Central District of Takestan County, Qazvin Province, Iran. At the 2006 census, its population was 126, in 35 families.

References 

Populated places in Takestan County